Snatch Up is a 2018 South Korean action comedy film written and directed by Heo Jun-hyeong.

Plot
The furious chase between an unemployed man, a delivery man, gangsters, a killer, and a cop all try to put their hands on a gun and a golf bag filled with cash for different purposes.

Cast

References

External links

Snatch Up at Naver Movies 

2018 films
South Korean action comedy films
2018 directorial debut films
2018 action comedy films
Little Big Pictures films
2010s South Korean films